A Girl in a Million is a 1946 British comedy film. It is notable for featuring Joan Greenwood in an early starring role; and Basil Radford and Naunton Wayne in their comedy double act as  two cricket-obsessed Englishmen, this time called Fotheringham and Prendergast.

Plot
Tony is an inventor who divorces a shrewish, nagging wife, and desiring to avoid all women, finds employment in a remote all-male department of the War Office. However, a woman soon arrives in the form of U.S. colonel's daughter, Gay, who is shell-shocked, and has lost the power of speech. Charmed by her and by the contrast with his former talkative wife, Tony soon falls in love and marries her. However, once wed, Gay suffers a further shock and recovers her speech, proving quite the match for Tony's first wife.

Cast
 Hugh Williams as Tony
 Joan Greenwood as Gay
 Basil Radford as Prendergast
 Naunton Wayne as Fotheringham
 Wylie Watson as Peabody
 Yvonne Owen as Molly
 Hartley Power as Colonel Sultzman
 Edward Lexy as Policeman
 James Knight as Pavilion Manager
 Charles Rolfe as Attendant
 Gwen Clark as Nurse
 Millicent Wolf as Sister
 Aubrey Mallalieu as Judge
 Garry Marsh as General
 Michael Hordern as Divorce Counsel
 Julian D'Albie as Dr Peters
 John Salew as Jenkins
 John Olson as Concert Stage Manager
 Muir Mathieson as Conductor
 Eileen Joyce as Solo Pianist

Reception

Box Office
It was the 24th most popular film at the British box office in 1946 after The Wicked Lady, The Bells of St Marys, Piccadilly Incident, The Captive Heart, Road to Utopia, Caravan, Anchors Away, The Corn is Green, Gilda, The House on 92nd Street, The Overlanders, Appointment with Crime, The Bandit of Sherwood Forest, Kitty, Spellbound, Scarlet Street, Men of Two Worlds, Courage of Lassie, Mildred Pierce, The Spiral Staircase''' and Brief Encounter, The Years Between and The Dolly Sisters''.

Critical reception
Sandra Brennan wrote in Allmovie, "feminists beware! This blatantly sexist comedy may definitely raise a few hackles" ; while David Parkinson in the Radio Times called it "an object lesson in how tastes change, this chauvinistic comedy was co-scripted (with producer-husband Sydney) by Muriel Box, who was one of the few female creatives with clout in postwar British cinema. Moreover, it made a star of Joan Greenwood in a role that basically dismisses women as blethering nuisances who should be seen and not heard...Talk about not standing the test of time."

References

External links
A Girl in a Million at IMDb

1946 films
British comedy films
1946 comedy films
Films with screenplays by Sydney Box
Films produced by Sydney Box
Films scored by Benjamin Frankel
Films with screenplays by Muriel Box
British black-and-white films
Films directed by Francis Searle
1940s British films